Sion Abbey was a Trappist monastery in Diepenveen, Overijssel, Netherlands, in the Diocese of Utrecht.

History
The monastery, which was set up in 1833, is a daughter house of Achel Abbey. This was the only Trappist community in the Netherlands north of the great rivers (i.e., the Nederrijn, the Lek, the Waal, the Merwede and the Maas). Since 1935 the monastery has had the status of an abbey. Most of the complex is in Neo-Gothic style and was designed by architect Gerard te Riele.

In 2015, the community sold their property and the remaining monks have founded New Sion Abbey on the island of Schiermonnikoog.

Notes

External links 

 New Sion Abbey (English)
 Sion Abbey official website 

Trappist monasteries in the Netherlands
1883 establishments in the Netherlands
Buildings and structures in Deventer
19th-century Christian monasteries
19th-century Roman Catholic church buildings in the Netherlands